Acanthobrama hulensis, sometimes known as the Hula bream, was a species of ray-finned fish in the family Cyprinidae.
Its natural habitats were swamps and freshwater lakes in Lake Hula in northern Israel. Acanthobrama hulensis looked much like a sardine. In Israel other members of the genus often are called "sardin" in culinary terms.

The deliberate draining of Lake Hula in the 1950s led to the extinction of this species, along with the cichlid fish Tristramella intermedia. The Israel painted frog was believed to be extinct until a female specimen was found in 2011. Acanthobrama hulensis was last recorded in 1975.

Description
They spawned from February to April externally.

See also
 List of extinct animals of Asia

References

Acanthobrama
Endemic fauna of Israel
Fish of Israel
Fish extinctions since 1500
Fish described in 1973
Taxonomy articles created by Polbot
Hula Valley
Taxobox binomials not recognized by IUCN